The ARD International Music Competition is the largest international classical music competition in Germany. It is organised by the Bayerischer Rundfunk and held once a year in Munich.

Since its inception in 1952, it has become one of the most prestigious classical music competitions. It takes place usually in September. It became one of the founding members of the World Federation of International Music Competitions in 1957. A prize at this international competition acted as a springboard for a later career. Notable past winners include: Jessye Norman, Sharon Isbin, Francisco Araiza, Natalia Gutman, Christoph Eschenbach, Anna Malikova, Nobuko Imai, Mitsuko Uchida, Thomas Quasthoff, Yuri Bashmet, Christian Tetzlaff, Sharon Kam, Heinz Holliger, Isabelle Moretti, Reinhold Friedrich, and Maurice André.

History
Between 1947 and 1950, the Radio Frankfurt held a "Young Soloists Competition". The earliest competition discovered two female vocalists who would soon take their place among the international talented: Christa Ludwig and Erika Köth. Instrumentalists included flautist Karlheinz Zöller and pianist Robert-Alexander Bohnke. The newly founded ARD continued the concept of bringing together talented young musicians from the entire globe.

The competition categories change from year to year and include solo instrumentsm voice and chamber ensembles. An emphasis has been placed on modern music, and contemporary composers have regularly been commissioned to write new pieces for this Competition since 2001.

350 to 450 young musicians usually apply each year, out of whom 200 candidates, from 35 to 40 countries, make it past the preliminary round. A large percentage of competitors come from countries other than Germany (up to 86%).

The 2020 edition was cancelled because of the COVID-19 pandemic in Germany.

Categories 

2000: Flute, Voice, Piano duo, Viola, String quartet
2001: Violin, Cello, Wind quintet, Percussion, Saxophone
2002: Piano, Oboe, Bassoon, Piano trio
2003: Voice, Clarinet, Trumpet, Double bass,
2004: Flute, Viola, String quartet, Harp
2005: Violin, Piano duo, Horn, Cello
2006: Piano, Voice (Opera), Voice (Concert/Lied), Wind quintet
2007: Oboe, Trombone, Piano trio, Percussion
2008: Bassoon, Clarinet, Viola, String quartet
2009: Violin, Voice, Double bass, Harp
2010: Flute, Piano duo, Horn, Cello
2011: Piano, Oboe, Piano duo, Trumpet, Organ
2012: Voice, Clarinet, String quartet
2013: Violin, Bassoon, Viola, Piano trio
2014: Piano, Cello, Wind quintet, Percussion
2015: Flute, Voice, Piano duo, Trombone
2016: Horn, Double bass, String quartet, Harp
2017: Piano, Violin, Oboe, Guitar
2018: Voice, Trumpet, Viola, Piano trio
2019: Bassoon, Clarinet, Cello, Percussion

Piano competition had been held almost uninterruptedly from 1952 to 1973, except the years 1955 and 1964. It was then held every other year till 1981. It was held consecutively from 1981 to 1983, and then every other year again till 1999.
In 1953, three categories were added: violin, flute, violin-piano duo. Violin competition was held every 3 years from 1966 to 1984.

Four categories were added in 1954: voice, oboe, bassoon, clarinet. The voice competition had been held every year from 1954 to 1972. It was then held every two years till 2000. Oboe competition had been held every five years from 1976 to 1996. Bassoon competition had been held six times in the 20th century.

The competition kept expanding categories in the following years, adding piano duo (1955), horn (1956), cello (1957), organ (1957). New categories in 1958 were cello-piano duo, trumpet, and harpsichord, which would only have three additional editions. String quartet competition opened in 1959.

The 1960s saw the first edition of piano trio (1961), viola (1962), trombone (1965), wind quintet (1966). Two categories briefly appeared: string trio (1961, 1969) and piano sight-reading (1963, 1965). Four categories premiered in the 1970s: guitar (1976), percussion (1977), double bass (1979), and recorder, which was only held twice so far (1978, 1988). The first harp competition was held in 1983, as its only edition in the 20th century.

Management 
Source Organization

Artistic Directors: Oswald Beaujean and Meret Forster

Managing Director: Elisabeth Kozik

Project Management: Anja Krainz

Public Relations: Ruth Wischmann

Prize money 
Prize money per category
 1. Prize €10,000
 2. Prize €7,500
 3. Prize €5,000

Winners

 Category:Prize-winners of the ARD International Music Competition

Full lists of winners can be retrieved from the competition's website.

2000s

2000
Voice (female)
1st Prize: Zoryana Kushpler, Ukraine
3rd Prizes (shared): Stefanie Krahnenfeld, Germany; Christa Mayer, Germany

Voice (male)
1st Prize: Konrad Jarnot, Great Britain
2nd Prize: Nathaniel Webster, USA
3rd Prize: Friedemann Röhlig, Germany

Viola
2nd Prize: Danusha Waskiewicz, Germany

Flute
2nd Prizes (shared): Rozàlia Szabó, Hungary; Henrik Wiese, Germany
3rd Prize: Kersten McCall, Germany

Piano Duo
1st Prize: Mati Mikalai / Kai Ratassepp, Estonia
2nd Prize: Duo d'Accord, Taiwan/Germany

String Quartet
2nd Prize: Avalon String Quartett, France/Canada/USA
3rd Prize: Quartetto Prometeo, Italy

2001
Violin
2nd Prize: Annette von Hehn, Germany
3rd Prizes (shared): Min Jung Kang, Korea; Yamei Yu, Germany

Cello
1st Prize: Danjulo Ishizaka, Germany
2nd Prizes (shared): Julie Albers, USA; Monika Leskovar, Croatia
3rd Prize: Thomas Carroll, Great Britain

Saxophone
2nd Prize: Alexandre Doisy, France
3rd Prizes (shared): Lutz Koppetsch, Germany; Julien Petit, France

Percussion
1st Prize: Marta Klimasara, Poland
2nd Prize: Eirik Raude, Norway
3rd Prize: Christophe Roldan, France

Wind Quintet
1st Prize: Miró Ensemble, Spain
2nd Prize: Orsolino Quintett, Germany/Austria
3rd Prize: St. Petersburg Woodwind Quintet, Russia

2002
Bassoon
2nd Prize: Matthias Rácz, Germany
3rd Prizes (shared): Jaakko Luoma, Finland; Lyndon Watts, Australia

Oboe
3rd Prizes (shared): Nora Cismondi, France; Alexandre Gattet, France

Piano
1st Prize: Denys Proshayev, Ukraine
2nd Prize: Ferenc Vizi, Romania
3rd Prize: Chiao-Ying Chang, Taiwan

Piano Trio
2nd Prizes (shared): Trio con Brio, Denmark/Korea; Trio Ondine, Sweden/Denmark/Norway

2003
Voice (female)
1st Prize: Marina Prudenskaja, Russia
2nd Prizes (shared): Andrea Lauren Brown, USA; Measha Brueggergosman, Canada
3rd Prize: Julia Sukmanova, Russia

Voice (male)
1st Prize: Gérard Kim, Korea
3rd Prizes (shared): Tyler Duncan, Canada; Günter Papendell, Germany

Double Bass
1st Prize: Nabil Shehata, Germany
2nd Prize: Roman Patkoló, Slovakia
3rd Prize: Ödön Rácz, Hungary

Clarinet
2nd Prize: Olivier Patey, France
3rd Prize: Florent Pujuila, France

Trumpet
1st Prize: David Guerrier, France
2nd Prize: Giuliano Sommerhalder, Switzerland
3rd Prizes (shared): Gabor Richter, Hungary; Guillaume Couloumy, France

2004
Viola
1st Prize: Antoine Tamestit, France
2nd Prize: Ryszard Groblewski, Poland
3rd Prize: Tomoko Akasaka, Japan

Flute
1st Prize: Magali Mosnier, France
2nd Prize: Pirmin Grehl, Germany
3rd Prize: Andrea Oliva, Italy

String Quartet
1st Prize: Ébène Quartet, France
2nd Prize: Faust Quartett, Germany
3rd Prize: Quatuor Benaïm, Israel/France

Harp
1st Prize: Anton Sie, Netherlands
2nd Prize: Nabila Chajai, France
3rd Prize: Mirjam Schroder, Germany

2005
Violin
1st Prize: Keisuke Okasaki, Japan
2nd Prize: Akiko Yamada, Japan
3rd Prize: Katja Lämmermann, Germany

Cello
1st Prize: Jing Zhao, China
2nd Prize: Alexander Bouzlov, Russia
3rd Prize: Alexander Chaushian, Armenia/Great Britain

Horn
1st Prize: Szabolcs Zempléní, Hungary
2nd Prizes (shared): Louis-Philippe Marsolais, Canada; Renate Hupka, Germany
3rd Prize: Christoph Eß, Germany

Piano Duo
2nd Prizes (shared): Victor y Luis del Valle, Spain; Piano Duo Poskute – Daukantas, Lithuania
3rd Prize: Silivanova – Puryzhinskiy, Russia

2006
Voice/Opera
1st Prize: Jun Mo Yang, Korea
2nd Prize: Joshua Hopkins, Canada
3rd Prizes (shared): Ilse Eerens, Belgium; Anna Kasyan, Armenia

Voice/Lied
2nd Prizes (shared): Roxana Constantinescu, Rumania; Carolina Ullrich, Chile/Germany
3rd Prizes (shared): Colin Balzer, Canada; Peter Schöne, Germany

Piano
1st Prize: Benjamin Kim, USA
2nd Prizes (shared): Hisako Kawamura, Japan; Marianna Shirinyan, Armenia

Wind Quintet
1st Prize: Quintette Aquilon, France
2nd Prize: Quintett Chantily, Germany/Hungary/Russia/Finland
3rd Prize: Weimarer Bläserquintett, Germany

2007
Oboe
1st Prize: Ramón Ortega Quero, Spain
2nd Prize: Ivan Podyomov, Russia
3rd Prize: Maria Sournatcheva, Russia

Trombone
1st Prize: Fabrice Millischer, France
2nd Prize: Frederic Belli, Germany
3rd Prize: Juan Carlos Matamoros, Spain

Percussion
1st Prize: Johannes Fischer, Germany
2nd Prize: Vassilena Serafimova, Bulgaria

Piano Trio
1st Prize: Tecchler Trio, Switzerland/Germany
2nd Prize: Morgenstern Trio, Germany/France
3rd Prize: Trio Cérès, France

2008
Viola
2nd Prize: Wen Xiao Zheng, China
3rd Prize: Teng Li, China

Clarinet
1st Prize: Sebastian Manz, Germany
3rd Prizes (shared): Shelly Ezra, Israel; Taira Kaneko, Japan

Bassoon
2nd Prizes (shared): Christian Kunert, Germany; Philipp Tutzer, Italy
3rd Prize: Václav Vonášek, Czech Republic
Bärenreiter Prize for the Best Interpretation of the Commissioned Work: Julien Hardy, France

String Quartet
1st Prize:  Apollon Musagete Quartett, Poland
2nd Prize: Afiara String Quartet, Canada
3rd Prizes (shared): Gémeaux Quartet, Germany/Switzerland; Verus String Quartet, Japan

2009
Violin
1st Prize: Hyeyoon Park, Korea
2nd Prize: Kei Shirai, Japan
3rd Prize: Lily Francis, USA

Double Bass
1st Prize: Gunars Upatnieks, Latvia
2nd Prize: Stanislau Anishchanka, Belarus
3rd Prizes (shared): Olivier Thiery, France; Ivan Zavgorodniy, Ukraine

Voice
1st Prize: Anita Watson, Australia
2nd Prize: Sunyoung Seo, Korea; Wilhelm Schwinghammer, Germany
3rd Prize: Hye Jung Lee, Korea; Falko Hönisch, Germany

2010s

2010
Flute
1st Prize: Loïc Schneider, France
2nd Prize: Daniela Koch, Austria
3rd Prize: Sooyun Kim, South Korea/USA
BR Klassik Prize: Ivannay Ternay, Ukraine

Cello
1st Prize: Julian Steckel, Germany
2nd Prize: Gen Yokosawa, Japan
3rd Prize: Tristan Cornut, France

Horn
1st Prize: Přemysl Vojta, Czech Republic
2nd Prizes (shared): Dániel Ember, Hungary; Paolo Mendes, Germany

Piano Duo
2nd Prize: Hyun Joo & Hee Jin June – Remnant Piano Duo, South Korea
3rd Prize: Susan & Sarah Wang – DoubleWang Duo, USA
Special Prize: Pianoduo Groebner & Trisko, Austria

2011
Oboe
2nd Prizes (shared): Philippe Tondre, France, with Public Prize; Ivan Podyomov, Russia
3rd Prize: Cristina Gómez Godoy, Spain; Marc Lachat, France

Organ
1st Prize: Schöch, Austria
2nd Prize: Anna-Victoria Baltrusch, German
3rd Prize: Lukas Stollhof, Dutch

Trumpet
1st Prize: Manuel Blanco Gómez-Limón, Spain
2nd Prize: Alexandre Baty, France
3rd Prize: Ferenc Mausz, Hungary, with Public Prize

Piano
1st Prize: Alexej Gorlatch, Ukraine, with Public Prize
2nd Prize: Tori Huang (Claire Huangci), USA
3rd Prize: Dasol Kim, South Korea
Special Prizes: EunAe Lee, South Korea

2012
Voice (male)
2nd Prizes (shared): Dashon Burton, USA; Hansung Yoo, South Korea, with Public Prize
3rd Prize: Kyubong Lee, South Korea

Voice (female)
1st Prize: Olena Tokar, Ukraine
2nd Prizes (shared): Sumi Hwang, South Korea; Anna Sohn, South Korea
3rd Prize: Sophia Christine Brommer, Germany, with Public Prize

Clarinet
2nd Prizes (shared): Sergey Eletskiy, Russia; Stojan Krkuleski, Serbia, with Public Prize; Annelien Van Wauwe, Belgium

String Quartet
1st Prize: Armida Quartet, Germany, with Public Prize
2nd Prize: Novus String Quartet, South Korea
3rd Prize: Calidore String Quartet, USA/Canada

2013
Violin
2nd Prizes (shared): Bomsori Kim, South Korea; Christel Lee, USA, with Public Prize
Special Prize of the Munich Chamber Orchestra: Diana Tishchenko, Ukraine

Viola
1st Prize: Yura Lee, South Korea
2nd Prize: Kyoungmin Park, South Korea, with Public Prize
3rd Prize: Katarzyna Budnik-Gałązka, Poland
Prize for the Best Interpretation of the Commissioned Work: Adrien Boisseau, France
Special Prize of the Henning Tögel Talent Foundation for Outstanding Talents: Lydia Rinecker, Germany

Bassoon
2nd Prizes : Rie Koyama, Japan, with Prize for the Best Interpretation of the Commissioned Work
3rd Prize: María José Rielo Blanco, Spain, with BR-Klassik Online-Preis

Piano Trio
2nd Prizes (shared): Van Baerle Trio, Netherlands, with Public Prize; Trio Karénine, France, with Prize for the Best Interpretation of the Commissioned Work

2014
Percussion

 1. Prize: Simone Rubino (Italy), Public Prize, Brüder Busch Prize
 2. Prize: Alexej Gerassimez (Germany), Special Prize for the Best Interpretation of the Commissioned Work
 3. Prize: Christoph Sietzen (Luxembourg )
 Special Prize U21: Vivi Vassileva (Germany), Semifinal
 Special Prize of Mozart Gesellschaft München: Vivi Vassileva (Germany), Semifinal

Violoncello

 1. Prize: István Várdai (Hungary)
 2. Prize: Andrei Ioniță (Romania), Special Prize for the Best Interpretation of the Commissioned Work, Special Prize Premiertone-Website
 3. Prize: Bruno Philippe (France), Public Prize
 Alice-Rosner-Prize  for an excellent interpretation of G. Ligeti Sonate for Violoncello solo: Pablo Ferrández (Spain), Semifinal
 Bärenreiter-Urtext-Prize: Alexey Zhilin, 2. Round

Wind Quintet
 2. Prize: Azahar Ensemble (Spain), Public Prize, ifp-Musikpreis
 3. Prize: Acelga Quintett (Germany/Luxembourg)
 3. Prize: Quintette Klarthe (France), BR-KLASSIK Onlineprize, Special Prize Palazzetto Bru Zane
 Special Prize for the Best Interpretation of the Commissioned Work: Canorusquintett (Germany), Semifinal
 Prize of Jeunesses Musicales Germany: Canorusquintett (Germany), Semifinal
 Bärenreiter-Urtext-Prize: Arcadia Wind Quintet (Venezuela), 1. Round

Piano
 2. Prize: Chi-Ho Han (South Korea), Publik Prize, Special Prize for the Best Interpretation of the Commissioned Work
 3. Prize: Kang-Un Kim (South Korea), Osnabrücker Musikpreis
 3. Prize: Florian Mitrea (Rumania), Special Prize  Münchener Kammerorchester
 Bärenreiter-Urtext-Prize: Nadjezda Pisareva (Russia), 2. Round

2015
Voice

 1. Prize: Emalie Savoy (USA), Special Prize „Orpheus“,Special Prize GENUIN classics
 2. Prize: Sooyeon Lee (South Korea), Public Prize
 3. Prize: Marion Lebegue (France), Special Prize for the Best Interpretation of the Commissioned Work
 Bärenreiter-Urtext-Prize: Jae Eun Park (South Korea)

Trombone

 1. Prize: Michael Buchanan (Great Britain), Public Prize
 2. Prize: Jonathan Reith, (France)
 3. Prize: Guilhem Kusnierek (France)
 Special Prize of Mozart Gesellschaft München: Juan González Moreno (Spain), Semifinal
 Special Prize for the Best Interpretation of the Commissioned Work: José Milton Vieira Leite Filho (Brasil)

Piano Duo

 1. Prize: Alina Shalamova & Nikolay Shalamov (Bulgaria/Russia), Public Prize, Special Prize for the Best Interpretation of the Commissioned Work, ifp-Musikpreis
 2. Prize: Duo Ani und Nia Sulkhanishvili (Georgia)
 2. Prize: Duo ShinPark (South Korea)
 3. Prize: Piano Duo Lok Ping & Lok Ting Chau (Hong Kong)
 Bärenreiter-Urtext-Prize: Piano Duo Chen – Armand (France/South Korea), Semifinal
 Special Prize U21: Piano Duo Chen – Armand (France/South Korea), Semifinal

Flute

 1. Prize: Sébastian Jacot (Switzerland ), Special Prize from Münchener Kammerorchester, Brüder-Busch-Prize, Osnabrücker Musikpreis
 2. Prize: Francisco López Martín (Spain), Public Prize, Special Prize for the Best Interpretation of the Commissioned Work, BR-KLASSIK Online-Prize
 3. Prize: Eduardo Belmar (Spain)
 Bärenreiter-Urtext-Prize: Othonas Gkogkas (Greece)
 Alice-Rosner-Prize: For an excellent interpretation of Heinz Holliger Sonate (in)solit(air)e: Mayuko Akimoto (Japan)

2016
Harp

 1. Prize: Agnès Clément (France), Publik Prize, Special Prize for the Best Interpretation of the Commissioned Work
 2. Prize: Anaïs Gaudemard (France), Special Prize from Münchener Kammerorchester
 3. Prize: Rino Kageyama (Japan)
 Special Prize of Mozart-Gesellschaft München: Magdalena Hoffmann (Germany), Semifinal
 Special Prize U21: Magdalena Hoffmann (Germany), Semifinal
 Bärenreiter-Urtext-Prize: Marika Cecilia Riedl (Germany)

Horn

 2. Prize: Marc Gruber (Germany), Publik Prize, Brüder-Busch-Prize
 2. Prize: Kateřina Javůrková (Czech Republic), BR-KLASSIK Online-Preis
 3. Prize: Félix Dervaux (France), Special Prize for the Best Interpretation of the Commissioned Work
 3. Prize: Nicolas Ramez (France)
 Bärenreiter-Urtext-Prize: Nicolás Gómez Naval (Spain)

Double Bass

 1. Prize: Wies de Boevé (Belgium), Publik Prize, ifp-Musikpreis
 2. Prize: Michael Karg (Germany)
 3. Prize: Dominik Wagner (Germany/Austria), Special Prize of Andreas-Wilfer-Meisterwerkstatt building Cellos and doublebasses
 Special Prize for the Best Interpretation of the Commissioned Work: Michail-Pavlos Semsis (Greece)
 Bärenreiter-Urtext-Prize: Marek Romanowski (Poland)

String Quartet

 1. Prize: Quatuor Arod (France), IDAGIO-Onlinepreis
 2. Prize: Aris Quartett (Germany), Publik Prize, Special Prize GENUIN classics, Special Prize ProQuartet, Osnabrücker Musikpreis
 3. Prize: Quartet Amabile (Japan), Special Prize for the Best Interpretation of the Commissioned Work
 Bärenreiter-Urtext-Prize: Quatuor Hanson (France/Great Britain)
 Alice-Rosner-Preis: For an excellent interpretation of Streichquartett nr. 1 from György Ligeti: Quatuor Arod (France)
 Prize of Jeunesses Musicales Germany: Giocoso Streichquartett Vienna
 Prize of Karl-Klingler-Stiftung: Goldmund Quartett (Germany)

2017
Violin

 2. Prize: Sarah Christian, Germany, Public Prize, Special Prize from Münchener Kammerorchesters, Henle-Urtextpreis
 2. Prize: Andrea Obiso, Italy, Special Prize for the Best Interpretation of the Commissioned Work, Henle-Urtextpreis
 3. Prize: Kristīne Balanas, Latvia, Henle-Urtextpreis

Piano

 1. Prize: JeungBeum Sohn, South Korea, Henle-Urtextpreis
 2. Prize: Fabian Müller, Germany, Public Prize, Brüder-Busch-Prize, Henle-Urtextpreis, Special Prize GENUIN classics
 3. Prize: Wataru Hisasue, Japan, Special Prize for the Best Interpretation of the Commissioned Work, Henle-Urtextpreis

Guitar

 2. Prize: Junhong Kuang, China, Public Prize, ifp-Musikpreis
 2. Prize: Davide Giovanni Tomasi, Italy/Switzerland
 3. Prize: Andrey Lebedev, Australia, Special Prize for the Best Interpretation of the Commissioned Work

Oboe

 2. Prize: Kyeong Ham, South Korea, BR-KLASSIK Online-Preis
 2. Prize: Thomas Hutchinson, New Zealand, Special Prize for the Best Interpretation of the Commissioned Work
 2. Prize: Juliana Koch, Germany, Public Prize, Osnabrücker Musikpreis

2018
Voice
1st Prize: Natalya Boeva, Russia
2nd Prize: Milan Siljanov, Switzerland
3rd Prize: Mingjie Lei, China
3rd Prize: Ylva Sofia Stenberg, Sweden

Trumpet
1st Prize Selina Ott, Austria
2nd Prize: Célestin Guérin, France
2nd Prize: Mihály Könyves-Tóth, Hungary
3rd Prize: (not awarded)

Piano Trio
1st Prize: Aoi Trio, Japan
2nd Prize: (not awarded)
3rd Prize: Trio Marvin, Kazakhstan / Russia / Germany
3rd Prize: Lux Trio, Korea

Viola
1st Prize: Diyang Mei, China
2nd Prize: Yucheng Shi, China
3rd Prize: Takehiro Konoe, Japan

2019
Violoncello
1st Prize: Haruma Sato, Japan
2nd Prize: Friedrich Thiele, Germany
3rd Prize: Sihao He, China

Bassoon
2nd Prize: Andrea Cellacchi, Italy
2nd Prize: Mathis Stier, Germany
3rd Prize: Theo Plath, Germany

Clarinet
1st Prize: Joë Christophe, France
2nd Prize: Carlos Alexandre Brito Ferreira, Portugal
2nd Prize: Han Kim, South Korea

Percussion
1st Prize: Kai Strobel, Germany
2nd Prize: Aurélien Gignoux, France/Switzerland
3rd Prize: Weiqi Bai, China

Prior 2000

Piano

1952  Alberto Colombo Italy
1952  Laurence Davis Australia
1952  Peter Wallfisch Israel
1954  Ingrid Haebler Austria
1954  Fernande Kaeser Switzerland
1956  Robert-Alexander Bohnke FRG
1957 1. Prize Thérèse Dussaut France
1957 2. Prize Sumiko Inouchi Japan
1958 1. Prize Hans Eckart Besch FRG
1958 2. Prize Michael Ponti US
1958 2. Prize Dieter Weber Austria
1959 1. Prize Friedrich Wilhelm Schnurr FRG
1959 2. Prize Gernot Kahl FRG
1959 2. Prize Norman Shetler US
1961 2. Prize Pavica Gvozdić Yugoslavia
1961 3. Prize Alexandra Ablewicz Poland
1962 2. Prize Christoph Eschenbach FRG
1962 3. Prize Milena Mollova Bulgaria
1963 2. Prize Edith Fischer Switzerland
1965 1. Prize Judith Burganger US
1965 3. Prize Dag Achatz Sweden
1966 1. Prize Claude Savard France
1966 3. Prize Mitsuko Uchida Japan
1967 3. Prize Anthony Goldstone UK
1967 3. Prize Valery Kastelsky USSR
1968 1. Prize Anne Queffélec France
1969 2. Prize Erika Lux Hungary
1969 3. Prize Piotr Paleczny Poland
1970 2. Prize André De Groote Belgium
1971 2. Prize Marian Migdal Poland
1971 2. Prize Martino Tirimo UK
1972 1. Prize Chen Pi-hsien Taiwan
1972 3. Prize Roland Keller FRG
1973 1. Prize James Tocco US
1973 2. Prize Myung-whun Chung Korea
1975 1. Prize Diane Walsh US
1975 2. Prize Natasha Tadson Israel
1975 3. Prize Nina Tichman US
1979 1. Prize Hans-Christian Wille FRG
1979 2. Prize Marioara Trifan US
1981 3. Prize Rolf Plagge FRG
1983 1. Prize Kei Itoh Japan
1983 3. Prize Andrei Nikolsky USSR
1983 3. Prize Hai-Kyung Suh Korea
1985 1. Prize Kalle Randalu USSR
1985 2. Prize Daniel Gortler Israel
1987 2. Prize Ricardo Castro Brazil
1987 2. Prize Bernd Glemser FRG
1987 3. Prize Thomas Duis FRG
1989 1. Prize Susanne Grützmann GDR
1989 2. Prize Alexandre Tharaud France
1989 3. Prize Kyōko Tabe Japan
1991 2. Prize Momo Kodama Japan
1993 1. Prize Anna Malikova Russia
1995 3. Prize Claire-Marie Le Guay France
1997 3. Prize Etsuko Hirose Japan
1999 2. Prize Severin von Eckardstein Germany

Piano Duo

1955 Kurt Bauer / Heidi Bung West Germany
1955 Aloys and Alfons Kontarsky West Germany
1964 2. Prize Marie-José Billiard / Julien Azaïs France
1964 2. Prize Joanne and Joyce Weintraub US
1974 1. Prize Anthony & Joseph Paratore US
1974 2. Prize Elif and Bedii Aran Turkey
1974 3. Prize Marina Horak / Håkon Austbø Yugoslavia/Norway
1980 2. Prize Alexander and Natalia Bagdasarov USSR
1980 2. Prize Cameron Grant / James Winn US
1980 3. Prize Carlos Duarte / Varda Shamban Venezuela/Israel
1986 3. Prize Zsuzsanna Kollar / Gabriella Lang Hungary
1986 3. Prize Stenzl Pianoduo West Germany
1992 2. Prize Thomas Hecht / Sandra Shapiro US
1992 3. Prize Silke-Thora Matthies / Christian Köhn Germany
1996 2. Prize Irene Alexeytchuk / Yuri Kot Ukraine
1996 2. Prize Genova & Dimitrov Bulgaria

Organ

1957 1. Prize Franz Lehrndorfer West Germany	
1957 2. Prize Viktor Lukas West Germany	
1959 1. Prize Hedwig Bilgram West Germany	
1959 2. Prize Lionel Rogg Switzerland	
1962 1. Prize Wolfgang Sebastian Meyer West Germany	
1962 2. Prize François Desbaillet Switzerland	
1962 3. Prize Mireille Lagacé Canada	
1966 2. Prize Cherry Rhodes US
1966 3. Prize Daniel Roth France	
1966 3. Prize Günther Kaunzinger West Germany	
1971 1. Prize Edgar Krapp West Germany	
1971 3. Prize Charles Benbow US	
1971 3. Prize Gerhard Weinberger West Germany	
1975 2. Prize Klemens Schnorr West Germany	
1975 3. Prize Martin Lücker West Germany	
1979 2. Prize Ludger Lohmann West Germany	
1979 3. Prize Karol Gołębiowski Poland	
1987 2. Prize Heidi Emmert West Germany	
1987 2. Prize Martin Sander West Germany	
1987 3. Prize Stefan Palm West Germany	
1994 2. Prize Ariane Metz Germany	
1994 3. Prize Leonhard Amselgruber Germany	
1999 2. Prize Martin Kaleschke Germany

Harpsichord
1956 2. Prize Zuzana Ruzickova Czechoslovakia
1958 1. Prize Vera Schwarz Austria
1964 2. Prize William Read US
1964 3. Prize Gottfried Bach West Germany
1964 3. Prize Jörg Ewald Dähler Switzerland
1970 2. Prize Martha Brickman Canada
1984 1. Prize Władysław Marek Kłosiewicz Poland

Voice

1954  FRG
1955 Johannes Wilbrink Netherlands
1957 1. Prize Jadwiga Románska Poland
1958 2. Prize Demeter Marczis Hungary
1958 2. Prize Jacques Villisech France
1960 1. Prize Ivan Rebroff FRG
1960 2. Prize Annabelle Bernard US
1960 2. Prize Raymond Michalski US
1960 3. Prize Teresa Żylis-Gara Poland
1960 4. Prize Thomas Carey US
1961 1. Prize  US
1961 3. Prize Benjamin Luxon UK
1962 1. Prize  Poland
1962 1. Prize Kenneth John Bowen UK
1962 2. Prize Franco Bordoni Italy
1963 1. Prize Jules Bastin Belgium
1963 1. Prize Veronica Tyler US
1964 3. Prize  Yugoslavia
1964 Concert Prize Max van Egmond Netherlands
1964 Lied Prize Bruce Abel US
1965 1. Prize Althea Bridges Australia
1965 2. Prize Teresa Wojtaszek-Kubiak Poland
1966 1. Prize Ileana Cotrubaș Romania
1966 1. Prize  USSR
1966 2. Prize Siegmund Nimsgern FRG
1967 1. Prize Knut Skram Norway
1967 3. Prize Joan Carden Australia
1968 1. Prize Jessye Norman US
1968 1. Prize Michael Schopper FRG
1970 3. Prize Victor von Halem FRG
1971 2. Prize Anita Terzian US
1972 1. Prize Robert Holl Netherlands
1972 3. Prize Otoniel Gonzaga Philippines
1972 3. Prize Edith Guillaume Denmark
1974 1. Prize Margaret Anne Marshall UK
1974 2. Prize Hanns-Friedrich Kunz FRG
1974 3. Prize Francisco Araiza Mexico
1976 2. Prize Mitsuko Shirai Japan
1978 2. Prize Zehava Gal Israel
1980 1. Prize  Japan
1980 2. Prize Edith Wiens Canada
1980 3. Prize Pamela Coburn US
1982 1. Prize Kaaren Erickson US
1982 2. Prize Anne Sofie von Otter Sweden
1984 3. Prize Ian Christopher Smith, Trinidad and Tobago
1986 1. Prize Barbara Kilduff US
1986 1. Prize Derek Lee Ragin US
1986 2. Prize  Japan
1988 1. Prize Thomas Quasthoff FRG
1988 2. Prize Lívia Ághová ČSSR
1990 1. Prize Andrzej Dobber Poland
1990 1. Prize Elena Moșuc Romania
1990 2. Prize Oliver Widmer Switzerland
1990 3. Prize Bodil Arnesen Norway
1992 2. Prize Melinda Paulsen US
1994 1. Prize  Poland
1994 2. Prize Christian Elsner Germany
1996 2. Prize Anna Korondi Hungary
1996 2. Prize Hanno Müller-Brachmann Germany

Violin

1953 Igor Ozim Yugoslavia
1956 Edith Peinemann West Germany
1958 2. Prize Oscar Yatco Philippines
1961 2. Prize Yossi Zivoni Israel
1961 3. Prize Gerhard Hetzel West Germany
1966 1. Prize Konstanty Kulka Poland
1966 2. Prize Isabella Petrosian USSR
1966 3. Prize Yuri Mazurkevich USSR
1969 2. Prize Cristiano Rossi Italy
1969 2. Prize Masako Yanagita Japan
1969 3. Prize Emmy Verhey Netherlands
1972 2. Prize Nilla Pierrou Sweden
1972 3. Prize Ernst Kovačič Austria
1975 2. Prize Dora Schwarzberg Israel
1975 3. Prize Kaja Danczowska Poland
1975 3. Prize Eugen Sârbu Romania
1978 3. Prize Olivier Charlier France
1978 3. Prize Irina Tseitlin stateless
1981 2. Prize Gwen Hoebig Canada
1981 3. Prize Florian Sonnleitner West Germany
1984 1. Prize Takumi Kubota Japan
1984 2. Prize Christian Tetzlaff West Germany
1984 3. Prize Peter Matzka US
1988 2. Prize Mi-kyung Lee Korea
1988 3. Prize Sonig Tchakerian Italy 
1992 2. Prize Erez Ofer Israel
1992 3. Prize Pavel Šporcl ČSSR
1992 3. Prize Scott St. John Canada
1995 1. Prize Piotr Pławner Poland
1995 2. Prize Bettina Gradinger Austria
1999 2. Prize Bin Huang China
1999 3. Prize Andrei Bielov Ukraine
1999 3. Prize Francesco Manara Italy

Violin Duo

1953 Ronald Woodcock / Lamar Crowson Australia/US
1955 Renato Giangrandi / Arlette Eggmann Italy
1956 Alan Grishman / Joel Ryce US
1957 1. Prize György Pauk/Peter Frankl Hungary
1957 2. Prize Thomas Brandis / Robert Henry West Germany/US	
1960 2. Prize Albert Kocsis / Zsuzsanna Szabó Hungary	
1960 3. Prize Joseph and Arlene Pach Canada	
1963 1. Prize Clara Bonaldi / Sylvaine Billier France
1963 2. Prize Gerhard Hetzel / Ramón Walter West Germany/Switzerland	
1963 3. Prize Andrew Dawes / Marylou Kolbinson Canada	
1968 2. Prize Rolf Schulte/ Taoko Ouchi West Germany/Japan	
1968 2. Prize Donald Weilerstein / Susan Halligan US
1968 3. Prize Takahiro Muroya / Naoyuki Inoue Japan	
1971 1. Prize Levon Chilingirian / Clifford Benson UK	
1971 2. Prize Isidora Schwarzberg / Boris Petrushansky USSR	
1971 3. Prize Ildikó Bán / Katalin Váradi Hungary	
1974 3. Prize Mirosław Ławrynowicz / Krystyna Makowska Poland
1974 3. Prize John and Dorothee Snow UK
1979 2. Prize Pavel Vernikov / Konstantin Bogino USSR
1979 3. Prize Peter and Gabriel Rosenberg West Germany	
1983 2. Prize Peter Matzka /Teresa Turner-Jones US 
1983 3. Prize Kazuki and Emiko Sawa Japan	
1990 1. Prize Hagai Shaham / Arnon Erez Israel	
1990 2. Prize Mayumi Seiler / Tünde Kurucz Austria/Hungary
1998 2. Prize Ariadne Daskalakis / Miri Yampolsky US/Israel	
1998 3. Prize Akiko Tanaka / Evgeny Sinaiski Japan/Russia	
1998 3. Prize Marco Rogliano / Maurizio Paciariello Italy

Viola

1962 3. Prize Hermann Voss West Germany
1967 2. Prize Nobuko Imai Japan
1971 1. Prize Vladimir Stopitschev USSR
1971 2. Prize Rainer Moog West Germany
1971 3. Prize Uri Mayer Israel
1976 1. Prize Yuri Bashmet USSR
1976 2. Prize Wolfram Christ West Germany
1980 2. Prize Johannes Flieder Austria
1980 3. Prize Kim Kashkashian US
1983 2. Prize Barbara Westphal West Germany
1989 2. Prize Hideko Kobayashi Japan
1989 3. Prize Roberto Díaz Chile
1993 2. Prize Hsin-Yun Huang Taiwan
1993 3. Prize Gilad Karni Israel
1997 1. Prize Naoko Shimizu Japan
1997 2. Prize Cathy Basrak US

Cello

1957 1. Prize Georg Donderer West Germany
1957 2. Prize Leslie Parnas US
1963 2. Prize Tsuyoshi Tsutsumi Japan
1963 3. Prize Raphael Sommer Israel
1968 2. Prize Valentin Erben Austria
1968 3. Prize Geneviève Teulières France
1973 2. Prize Denis Brott Canada
1973 2. Prize Jean Deplace France
1973 3. Prize Frans Helmerson Sweden
1977 1. Prize Antônio Meneses Brasil
1977 3. Prize Georg Faust West Germany
1982 2. Prize Alexander Baillie UK
1982 2. Prize Young-Chang Cho Korea
1986 2. Prize Michal Kaňka ČSSR
1986 2. Prize Gustav Rivinius West Germany
1986 3. Prize Jean-Guihen Queyras France
1990 2. Prize Alban Gerhardt West Germany
1990 2. Prize Michael Sanderling GDR
1990 3. Prize Ludwig Quandt West Germany
1994 1. Prize Jens Peter Maintz Germany
1994 2. Prize Tatjana Vassiljeva Russia
1994 3. Prize Tanja Tetzlaff Germany
1998 2. Prize Niklas Eppinger Germany
1998 3. Prize Sol Gabetta Argentina

Bass
1979 2. Prize Michinori Bunya Japan
1979 3. Prize Jiři Hudec ČSSR
1979 3. Prize Josef Niederhammer Austra
1985 2. Prize Esko Laine Finland
1985 2. Prize Dorin Marc Romenia
1985 3. Prize Håkan Ehren Norway
1991 2. Prize Giuseppe Ettore Italy
1991 3. Prize Janne Saksala Finland

Flute

1953 Peter-Lukas Graf Switzerland
1953 Konrad Hampe West Germany
1960 1. Prize Paul Meisen West Germany
1960 2. Prize Michel Debost France
1960 2. Prize Hirohiko Kato Japan
1964 2. Prize Michel Debost France
1964 2. Prize Paula Robison (née Sylvester) US
1964 3. Prize Sylvia Navarro Uruguay
1970 2. Prize Valentin Zverev USSR
1970 3. Prize Gunther Pohl West Germany
1974 2. Prize Abbie de Quant Netherlands
1974 2. Prize Roswitha Staege West Germany
1974 3. Prize Irena Grafenauer Yugoslavia
1979 2. Prize Irena Grafenauer Yugoslavia
1979 3. Prize Shigenori Kudō Japan
1985 3. Prize Gaby Pas-Van Riet Netherlands
1990 1. Prize Petri Alanko Finland
1990 2. Prize Michael Martin Kofler Austria
1995 2. Prize Davide Formisano Italy
1995 2. Prize Sabine Kittel Germany

Oboe

1954 Gaston Maugras France
1961 1. Prize Heinz Holliger Switzerland
1961 2. Prize André Lardrot France
1961 3. Prize Maurice Bourgue France
1967 1. Prize Maurice Bourgue France
1967 3. Prize Anatoly Lyubimov USSR
1972 2. Prize Hansjörg Schellenberger West Germany
1976 3. Prize Thomas Indermühle Switzerland
1981 2. Prize Klaus Becker West Germany
1981 3. Prize David Walter France
1986 2. Prize Volkmar Schöller West Germany
1986 3. Prize Nicholas Daniel UK
1986 3. Prize Fabian Menzel West Germany
1991 2. Prize François Leleux France
1991 3. Prize Washington Barella Brasil
1996 2. Prize Stefan Schilli Germany
1996 3. Prize Clara Dent Austria
1996 3. Prize Dominik Wollenweber Germany

Bassoon

1954 André Rabot France
1958 2. Prize Gábor Janota Hungary
1965 3. Prize Klaus Thunemann West Germany
1975 2. Prize Jiři Seidl ČSSR
1984 2. Prize Dag Jensen Norway
1984 3. Prize Holger Straube GDR
1990 2. Prize Sergio Azzolini Italy
1990 2. Prize Dag Jensen Norway

Clarinet

1954 Norbert Bourdon France
1957 1. Prize Edmond Boulanger France
1957 2. Prize Karl Leister West Germany
1962 2. Prize Karl Leister West Germany
1968 1. Prize Franklin Cohen US
1968 3. Prize Kurt Weber Switzerland
1973 3. Prize Rainer Schumacher West Germany
1977 3. Prize Claude Faucomprez France
1977 3. Prize David Shifrin US
1982 2. Prize Philippe Cuper France
1982 2. Prize Charles Neidich US
1982 3. Prize John Bruce Yeh US
1987 2. Prize Anna-Maija Korsimaa Finland
1987 3. Prize Fabrizio Meloni Italy
1987 3. Prize Richard Rimbert France
1992 2. Prize Sharon Kam Israel
1992 3. Prize Alessandro Carbonare Italy
1998 3. Prize Nicolas Baldeyrou France

Trumpet

1958 2. Prize Werner Roelstraete Belgium
1963 1. Prize Maurice Jean André France
1963 3. Prize Francis Marcel Hardy France
1971 2. Prize Janis Marshelle Coffman US
1971 2. Prize Guy Michel Touvron France
1980 2. Prize Richard Steuart Canada
1980 3. Prize Ketil Christensen Denmark
1986 2. Prize Reinhold Friedrich West Germany
1986 3. Prize Urban Agnas Sweden
1986 3. Prize George Vosburgh US
1993 2. Prize Wolfgang Bauer Germany
1993 3. Prize Jens Lindemann Canada
1997 3. Prize Gábor Boldoczki Hungary
1997 3. Prize Olivier Theurillat France

Horn

1956 Gerd Seifert West Germany
1960 2. Prize Josef Brazda ČSSR
1960 2. Prize Peter Damm GDR
1960 3. Prize Jaroslav Kotulan ČSSR
1960 3. Prize Hans Helfried Richter West Germany
1964 1. Prize Hermann Baumann West Germany
1964 2. Prize Ferenc Tarjáni Hungary
1964 3. Prize Jaroslav Kotulan ČSSR
1969 1. Prize Norbert Hauptmann West Germany
1969 2. Prize Zdeněk Tylšar ČSSR
1969 3. Prize Pavel Jevstignejev USSR
1973 2. Prize Johannes Ritzkowsky West Germany
1973 3. Prize Vladimíra Bouchalová ČSSR
1973 3. Prize Vladislav Grigorov Bulgaria
1978 2. Prize John MacDonald Canada
1978 3. Prize Zdeněk Divoký ČSSR
1978 3. Prize James Ross US
1983 1. Prize Radovan Vlatković Yugoslavia
1983 3. Prize Marie-Luise Neunecker West Germany
1983 3. Prize Corbin Wagner US
1988 2. Prize Jindřich Petráš ČSSR
1988 2. Prize James Sommerville Canada
1988 3. Prize Geoffrey Bain Winter US
1994 1. Prize Radek Baborák ČSSR
1994 2. Prize Markus L. Frank Germany
1994 3. Prize Markus Maskuniitty Finland
1999 2. Prize Alessio Allegrini Italy
1999 2. Prize László Seemann Hungary
1999 3. Prize Sibylle Mahni Switzerland

Trombone

1965 2. Prize Jean-Pierre Mathieu France
1965 2. Prize Zdeněk Pulec ČSSR
1974 2. Prize Ronald Barron US
1974 2. Prize Branimir Slokar Yugoslavia
1974 3. Prize Michel Becquet France
1981 2. Prize Michel Becquet France
1981 2. Prize Michael Mulcahy Australia
1981 3. Prize Gilles Millière France
1989 2. Prize Jonas Krister Bylund Sweden
1989 3. Prize Heather Buchman US
1989 3. Prize Thomas Horch West Germany
1995 3. Prize András Fejér Hungary
1995 3. Prize Jean Raffard France

String quartet

1959 2. Prize Weller Quartett Austria
1965 1. Prize Dimov Quartet Bulgaria
1965 2. Prize Bernède Quartet France
1970 1. Prize Tokyo String Quartet Japan
1973 3. Prize Wilanów Quartet Poland
1977 2. Prize Éder Quartett Hungary
1982 2. Prize Havlák Quartett ČSSR
1982 3. Prize Auryn Quartet West Germany
1987 2. Prize Parisii Quartet France
1987 2. Prize Petersen Quartet GDR
1991 2. Prize Mandelring Quartett Germany
1991 2. Prize Neues Leipziger Streichquartett Germany
1996 1. Prize Artemis Quartet Germany/Russia
1996 3. Prize Quatuor Castagneri France/Romania

Piano trio

1961 1. Prize Junges Wiener Trio Austra
1969 1. Prize Derevjanko Trio USSR	
1969 2. Prize Bondurjanskij Trio USSR	
1969 3. Prize Stuttgarter Klaviertrio West Germany	
1976 3. Prize Oslo Trio Norway
1981 2. Prize Zingara Trio U.K.
1981 3. Prize Apollo Trio Korea/US
1981 3. Prize Grüneburg Trio West Germany	
1988 2. Prize Trio Wanderer France
1995 1. Prize Trio Bartholdy France
1995 2. Prize Trio di Parma Italy
1998 2. Prize Clemente Trio Germany
1998 2. Prize Trio di Parma Italy

Wind quintet

1966 1. Prize Bläserquintett des Akademischen Kirov Theaters USSR
1966 2. Prize Akademisches Bläserquintett Prag ČSSR
1966 3. Prize Bläserquintett der Deutschen Oper Berlin West Germany
1975 2. Prize Syrinx Quintett West Germany
1975 3. Prize Bläserquintett der Jeunesses Musicales Budapest Hungary
1980 2. Prize Chalumeau Quintett West Germany
1980 2. Prize Nielsen Quintett France
1985 2. Prize Berliner Bläserquintett GDR
1985 3. Prize Albert Schweitzer Quintett West Germany
1985 3. Prize British Woodwind Quintet U.K.
1989 1. Prize Ma’a lot Quintett West Germany
1989 2. Prize Arcis Quintett West Germany
1989 3. Prize Kammervereinigung Berlin GDR
1993 2. Prize Quintetto Bibiena Italy
1993 2. Prize Quintette Debussy France
1993 3. Prize Kammervereinigung Berlin Germany
1997 1. Prize Afflatus Quintett ČSSR
1997 2. Prize Quintette Nocturne France
1997 3. Prize Orsolino Quintett Germany/Austra

Percussion
1977 2. Prize Sumire Yoshihara Japan
1977 3. Prize Midori Takada Japan
1985 1. Prize Peter Sadlo West Germany
1997 2. Prize Markus Leoson Sweden

Harp
1983 2. Prize Isabelle Moretti France

Guitar
1976 2. Prize Sharon Isbin US
1976 3. Prize Ricardo Fernández-Iznaola Venezuela
1982 2. Prize Stefano Grondona Italy
1982 2. Prize Timo Korhonen Finland
1982 3. Prize Thomas Müller-Pering West Germany
1989 1. Prize Luis Orlandini Chile
1989 3. Prize Miguel Charosky Argentina
1989 3. Prize Alexander Swete Austria
1993 2. Prize Joaquín de Jesús Clerch Diaz Cuba
1993 2. Prize Pablo Márquez Argentina

Recorder
1978 3. Prize Shigeharu Hirao-Yamaoka Japan
1978 3. Prize Michael Schneider West Germany
1988 2. Prize Robert Ehrlich U.K.
1988 2. Prize Carin van Heerden South Africa
1988 3. Prize Dan Laurin Sweden

Piano playing from the sheet
1963 1. reward Karl Bergemann West Germany
1963 2. reward Solange Robin-Chiapparin France
1963 3. reward Sylvaine Billier France
1965 2. reward Frank Maus West Germany
1965 2. reward Lucia Negro Italy
1965 3. reward Waldemar Strecke West Germany

References

External links 

Internationaler Musikwettbewerb der ARD Deutsches Musikinformationszentrum

ARD (broadcaster)
Music competitions in Germany
Classical music in Germany
Piano competitions
Violin competitions
Singing competitions
Annual events in Germany
Recurring events established in 1952
1952 establishments in West Germany